First ScotRail was a train operating company in Scotland owned by FirstGroup which operated the ScotRail franchise from October 2004 until March 2015. Prior to October 2004, trains were run by ScotRail (National Express). First ScotRail was succeeded by Abellio ScotRail on 1 April 2015.

First ScotRail operated most commuter and long-distance services within Scotland, and some services to northern England, as well as the Caledonian Sleeper to London. Of FirstGroup's four train operating companies, ScotRail was the second largest (in terms of number of passenger journeys 2013–14) after First Great Western at the time of the termination of its franchise.

History

From March 1997 until October 2004, National Express operated the ScotRail franchise, as ScotRail.

In July 2003, the Scottish Executive and the Strategic Rail Authority announced Arriva, FirstGroup and National Express had been shortlisted to bid for the new franchise. In June 2004, the franchise was awarded to FirstGroup, with the services operated by ScotRail transferring to First ScotRail on 17 October 2004.

On 1 January 2006, Transport Scotland was created to carry out the Scottish Executive's transport responsibilities including its then newly devolved powers over rail franchising.

In April 2008, Transport Scotland granted First ScotRail a three-year franchise extension until November 2014.

In September 2008, Transport Scotland announced that all First ScotRail trains, including those previously operated on behalf of the Strathclyde Partnership for Transport, would be repainted in a new blue livery with white saltire markings on the carriage ends. The rebranding put less emphasis on the First and is marketed as "ScotRail: Scotland's Railway". The first unit to receive the new livery was 170434, unveiled at Glasgow Queen Street on 22 September 2008.

On 8 October 2014, First ScotRail confirmed its bid to retain the franchise had been unsuccessful and that the franchise transferred to Abellio ScotRail on 1 April 2015.

On the evening of 31 March 2015, the Caledonian Sleeper services were split into a new franchise, operated by Serco.

Network

Main lines

Express trains operated between Edinburgh, Glasgow, Inverness, Dundee and Aberdeen. The Highland Main Line links Inverness to the south. Some stretches of main line, such as the Highland Main Line, are single track, and express trains must call at intermediate stations to permit trains coming in the opposite direction to pass.

The main lines of Scotland are:
Ayrshire Coast Line
Dundee–Aberdeen line
Edinburgh–Dundee line
Fife Circle Line
Glasgow–Edinburgh via Carstairs line
Glasgow–Edinburgh via Falkirk line
Glasgow–Dundee line
Glasgow South Western Line
Highland Main Line

Glasgow

The densest part of the network was the suburban network around Glasgow, with 183 stations, the second-largest suburban rail network in the UK, after London. Much of it is  electrified. Glasgow’s main terminal stations are Central and Queen Street stations. ScotRail operated trains in this area under the Strathclyde Partnership for Transport (SPT) brand. However, the Strathclyde Partnership for Transport no longer has any input into specifying rail services in the Glasgow area. DMUs and EMUs that were liveried in the carmine and cream livery were stripped of the Strathclyde logos. Lines in and around Glasgow were:

Argyle Line
Ayrshire Coast Line
Cathcart Circle Lines
Croy Line
Cumbernauld Line
Inverclyde Line
Maryhill Line

Motherwell–Cumbernauld line
North Clyde Line (extended to Cumbernauld & Edinburgh)
Paisley Canal line
Shotts Line
Glasgow South Western Line
Whifflet Line (incorporated into the Argyle Line)

The North Clyde Line is now linked to the Edinburgh-Bathgate Line (see Edinburgh, below) with the completion of the Airdrie–Bathgate rail link, creating a new direct link between Glasgow and Edinburgh. There is also a proposal to create a new rail link across the city with the Crossrail Glasgow project.

Edinburgh

Edinburgh’s suburban network is less dense than Glasgow’s. Edinburgh’s main station is Waverley. The main railway line through the city centre runs in a cutting immediately below Edinburgh Castle. Railway lines running north from Edinburgh to Fife and the Highlands cross the Firth of Forth via the Forth Bridge. Lines in and around Edinburgh were:
Edinburgh–Bathgate line (incorporated into the North Clyde Line)
Edinburgh Crossrail
Edinburgh–Dunblane line
North Berwick Line
Shotts Line
Edinburgh–Dundee line

The Edinburgh rail network is being expanded with the construction of the Waverley Line to the Borders, and the Edinburgh–Bathgate Line has been extended by the Airdrie–Bathgate rail link. A project to open a rail link to Edinburgh Airport was cancelled in September 2007 by the Scottish Government in favour of construction of a station at nearby Gogar which will connect with the Edinburgh tram network to take passengers to the terminal. A proposal to re-open the Edinburgh suburban railway line has been made by campaigning groups.

Rural lines

Rural lines include the scenic West Highland Line, Kyle of Lochalsh line and Far North Line. These lines carried more passengers, mostly tourists, during the summer months, but provided a valuable link and social service during the winter months.

Many rural lines are single track. Trains terminating at the coastal towns of Oban and Mallaig connected with the Caledonian MacBrayne ferry services to Skye, Colonsay, Lismore, Islay and the Outer Hebrides and Inner Hebrides.

The rural lines were:
Aberdeen–Inverness line
Far North Line
Kyle of Lochalsh line
West Highland Line

InterCity & Sleeper services

First ScotRail operated some services that ventured south of the border: principally the Caledonian Sleeper to London Euston along the West Coast Main Line, and a three times daily cross-country service between Newcastle upon Tyne and Glasgow Central via Carlisle and Kilmarnock.

Performance
Performance figures for National Express’s last quarter as franchise holder, July to September 2004, were:

Performance figures for FirstGroup’s first quarter as franchise holder, October to December 2004, were:

FirstGroup started operating the franchise on 17 October 2004.

The performance figures released by the Office for Rail Regulation (ORR) are as follows:

Note:
 The percentage change figures are not the actual increases in % but the percentage increase in the % value.
 These values are very similar to the sector performance level.

Controversy
In June 2009 a report by Strathclyde Partnership for Transport revealed passenger figures from ScotRail contain 7.2 million more passenger journeys than were actually made. Transport Scotland said this gross overestimate did not affect the decision to extend the franchise (the franchise having been extended under controversial conditions in 2008).

Rolling stock

First ScotRail inherited a fleet of Class 150, Class 156, Class 158, Class 170, Class 314, Class 318, Class 320 and Class 334s from National Express, as well as Mark 2 carriages and Mark 3 sleepers for use on the Caledonian Sleeper.

First ScotRail contracted EWS to haul the Caledonian Sleeper services. Class 90s were used south of Edinburgh and Glasgow Central with Class 67s used on the portions to Fort William, Aberdeen and Inverness. A dedicated pool has been created due to the need to fit cast steel brakes. Three Class 90s were repainted in First ScotRail livery with EWS logos.

During 2005 the Edinburgh - North Berwick Line services were operated by English Welsh & Scottish Class 90s with former Virgin Trains Mark 3 carriages and a Driving Van Trailer. In late 2005, five Class 322s were transferred from One to replace these.

From December 2008, ScotRail operated a set of DB Schenker Mark 2 carriages on a peak-hour Fife Circle Line service hauled by a Class 67. A second set was operated for a while.

In July 2008, Transport Scotland funded the acquisition of 22 three-carriage and 16 four-carriage Class 380 Desiros with the first entering service in December 2010. These trains operated Ayrshire and Inverclyde services, adding extra capacity and allowed the cascade of existing stock to the new Glasgow to Edinburgh services via the reopened Airdrie to Bathgate line.

Fleet at end of franchise

Past fleet
Former train types operated by First ScotRail include:

Stations
The majority of Scotland's 340 passenger stations were operated by First ScotRail under Network Rail ownership. ScotRail operated Lockerbie station although none of its services called there.

Depots
First ScotRail's fleet was maintained at Edinburgh Haymarket, Glasgow Shields Road, Corkerhill and Inverness depots.  In early 2005 the rebuilt Glasgow Eastfield reopened.

Demise
In June 2012, the Scottish Government announced that when the ScotRail franchise was re-tendered in 2014, the Caledonian Sleeper services would be transferred to a standalone franchise. In May 2014, it was announced that this new franchise had been awarded to Serco.

In October 2014, it was announced that FirstGroup had been unsuccessful in its bid to retain the ScotRail franchise, and that Abellio would take it over from April 2015.

The franchise duly passed to Abellio ScotRail at midnight on 1 April 2015. The Caledonian Sleeper services transferred to Serco several hours beforehand, during the evening of 31 March 2015.

See also
 Transport in Scotland
 Transport in Edinburgh
 Transport in Glasgow
 :Category:Transport in Scotland by council area
 Caledonian Sleeper
 Strathclyde Partnership for Transport
 Transport Initiatives Edinburgh
 Glasgow Subway
 Transport Scotland (government agency)
 List of railway lines in Great Britain
 Abellio ScotRail

References

Scottish Government. Scottish Transport Statistics No. 24: 2005 Edition. Accessed on 2 October 2005.
Scottish Parliament Information Centre. Changes to the regulation of Scotland's railways. Accessed on 2 October 2005.
RailBritain.com. First ScotRail fleet size as of December 2004. Accessed on 2 October 2005.

External links

Company website
ScotRail network map
Map of Glasgow & Edinburgh rail network (National Rail)
ScotRail reports - the Scotsman

 
 
 
 
|- 

Companies based in Aberdeen
Defunct train operating companies
FirstGroup railway companies
Railway companies established in 2004
Railway companies disestablished in 2015
Railway companies of Scotland
2004 establishments in Scotland
2015 disestablishments in Scotland
British companies disestablished in 2015
British companies established in 2004